Richard Wayne Robertson (born September 15, 1968) is an American former professional baseball pitcher. He played during six seasons in Major League Baseball (MLB) for the Pittsburgh Pirates, Minnesota Twins, and Anaheim Angels.

Career
Robertson was drafted by the Pirates in the 9th round of the 1990 Major League Baseball Draft. Robertson played his first professional season with their Class A (Short Season) Welland Pirates in 1990, and his last with the Colorado Rockies' Double-A Carolina Mudcats and the Triple-A units of the Texas Rangers (Oklahoma RedHawks), Pittsburgh Pirates (Nashville Sounds), and Cincinnati Reds (Indianapolis Indians) in 1999.

External links
, or Pura Pelota (Venezuelan Winter League)

1968 births
Living people
American expatriate baseball players in Canada
Anaheim Angels players
Augusta Pirates players
Baseball players from Texas
Buffalo Bisons (minor league) players
Carolina Mudcats players
Indianapolis Indians players
Major League Baseball pitchers
Minnesota Twins players
Nashville Sounds players
Oklahoma RedHawks players
People from Nacogdoches, Texas
Pittsburgh Pirates players
Salem Buccaneers players
Salt Lake Buzz players
San Jacinto Central Ravens baseball players
San Jacinto College alumni
Somerset Patriots players
Texas A&M Aggies baseball players
Texas A&M University alumni
Tiburones de La Guaira players
American expatriate baseball players in Venezuela
Vancouver Canadians players
Welland Pirates players